Patrick (Patou) Cokayne Keely (died 1970) was a British graphic artist known for his Second World War posters for the Ministry of Information along with stylised commercial posters for publishers, the GPO and public transport.

Keely also designed the British 4d World Scout Jubilee Jamboree stamp of 1957 and the 1s3d stamp from the 1958 Sixth British Empire and Commonwealth Games Cardiff set.

References

British war artists
1970 deaths
British artists
Keely
Year of birth missing
World War II artists